Umar Nawaz (born 7 December 1986) is a Canadian cricketer. He made his List A cricket debut in the 2015 ICC World Cricket League Division Two tournament for Canada against Uganda on 24 January 2015.

References

External links
 

1986 births
Living people
Canadian cricketers
Place of birth missing (living people)